The Perfect Patient, also known as Quick, is a 2019 Swedish drama film directed by Mikael Håfström. It follows Sweden’s greatest judicial scandal after the truth about serial killer Thomas Quick is revealed by journalist Hannes Råstam.

Cast 
 Jonas Karlsson - Hannes Råstam
 David Dencik - Thomas Quick
 Alba August - Jenny Küttim
 Magnus Roosmann - Christer van der Kwast

Reception
The Perfect Patient received mixed reviews, including a 3.5 star review from CineMagazine.

References

External links 

2019 drama films
2010s Swedish films
2010s Swedish-language films
Films directed by Mikael Håfström
Swedish drama films